Venice, the Moon and You is a 1958 Italian comedy film directed by Dino Risi.

Cast 
 Alberto Sordi: Bepi
 Marisa Allasio: Nina
 Ingeborg Schöner: Nathalie
 Nino Manfredi: Toni
 Niki Dantine: Janet
 Riccardo Garrone: Don Fulgenzio
 Luciano Marcelli: Don Giuseppe
 Anna Campori: Claudia
 Dina De Santis: Gina
 Giuliano Gemma: Brando

References

External links

1958 films
Films directed by Dino Risi
1958 comedy films
Films set in Venice
Films shot in Venice
Italian comedy films
1950s Italian films